William Herbert Gray III (August 20, 1941 – July 1, 2013) was an American politician and member of the Democratic Party who represented  from 1979 to 1991. He also served as chairman of the House Committee on the Budget from 1985 to 1989 and House Majority Whip from 1989 to 1991. He resigned from Congress in September of that year to become president and chief executive officer of the United Negro College Fund, a position he held until 2004.

As an African American, he was the fourth-highest-ranking member of the House at the time of his resignation and a minister in Philadelphia. He was co-founder of the government lobbying and advisory firm, Gray Loeffler LLC, headquartered in Washington D.C.

Early life
Gray was born in Baton Rouge, Louisiana, and spent his early years in St. Augustine, Florida, where his father was president of  Florida Normal and Industrial Institute, Tallahassee, Florida, where his father was president of  Florida A & M College. In 1949, upon the death of his grandfather, Gray's family moved to North Philadelphia, Pennsylvania where he graduated from Simon Gratz High School. He attended Franklin & Marshall College, where he received a bachelor's degree in 1963. He went on to obtain a master's in divinity from Drew Theological Seminary in 1966 and a master's in theology from Princeton Theological Seminary in 1970. Gray received a L.H.D. from Bates College in 1994.

Career
In 1972, Gray succeeded his father as the senior minister at Bright Hope Baptist Church in Philadelphia. He was elected as a Democrat to represent Philadelphia in the United States House of Representatives in 1978. He represented Pennsylvania's 2nd congressional district in the House of Representatives from 1978 until his resignation on September 11, 1991. He was the first African-American to chair the House Budget Committee and also the first to serve as the Majority Whip (1989–1991). As chairman of the Committee on Budget, Gray introduced H.R. 1460, an anti-Apartheid bill that prohibited loans and new investment in South Africa and enforced sanctions on imports and exports with South Africa. This bill was an instrumental precursor to the Comprehensive Anti-Apartheid Act of 1986 (H.R. 4868).

Gray resigned unexpectedly from Congress in 1991 to serve as president of the United Negro College Fund from 1991 to 2004. The move was considered surprising and prompted speculation that it may have been connected with an investigation into alleged campaign finance violations by the Gray team. A Pennsylvania Senate seat had been left vacant when Senator John Heinz was killed in a plane crash. Major-party candidates were chosen by the party committees because it was too late for a primary. The speculation was that Attorney General Dick Thornburgh struck a deal with Gray, who not only had been the subject of an investigation into campaign finance irregularities but also a grand jury investigation into his church's financial dealings. It was reported that Gray agreed not run in the special election and in return Thornburgh would drop the investigations. Thornburgh resigned as Attorney General and went on to run himself, but lost in an upset to Democrat Harris Wofford.

Gray served as a special adviser to the President and Secretary of State for Haitian affairs in 1994. He was named to the PoliticsPA list of "Pennsylvania's Top Political Activists."

Outside politics he was also a businessman who has been a director at Dell from 2000. Gray was a director of J.P. Morgan Chase & Co., Prudential Financial Inc., Rockwell International Corporation, Visteon Corporation and Pfizer. He retired from Bright Hope Baptist Church in 2007 and was succeeded by Kevin R. Johnson.

Personal life
Gray was married to the former Andrea Dash; they had three sons. Gray was a member of Alpha Phi Alpha fraternity. Gray died on July 1, 2013, in London, while attending the Wimbledon tennis tournament.

Awards and honors
In 1997 he received the Four Freedom Award for the Freedom of Worship.

In 2014 President Barack Obama signed U.S. House resolution 4838 directing Amtrak to rename Philadelphia's 30th Street Station to William H. Gray III 30th Street Station.

See also
List of African-American United States representatives

References

External links

Bio with picture from the National Council of Churches
William Gray - Forbes Profile
Dell Profile
Pew foster care

|-

|-

|-

|-

|-

|-

1941 births
2013 deaths
20th-century African-American politicians
African-American men in politics
20th-century American politicians
21st-century African-American people
African-American Baptist ministers
African-American Christians
African-American members of the United States House of Representatives
African-American people in Pennsylvania politics
American lobbyists
Baptist ministers from the United States
Baptists from Louisiana
Bates College alumni
Democratic Party members of the United States House of Representatives from Pennsylvania
Directors of JPMorgan Chase
Drew University alumni
Franklin & Marshall College alumni
Political activists from Pennsylvania
People from St. Augustine, Florida
Politicians from Baton Rouge, Louisiana
Politicians from Philadelphia
Princeton Theological Seminary alumni
Members of Congress who became lobbyists